Adande Thorne (born July 10, 1980), better known by his YouTube username Swoozie (stylized as sWooZie), is a Trinidadian-American YouTube personality, animator, comedian, and actor. As of November 2022, his YouTube channel has over 1.4 billion views. In 2015, he signed with the Creative Artists Agency. In January 2016, he was one of three people who interviewed President Barack Obama during a YouTube livestream.

As a professional gamer, he competed in Dead or Alive 4 for the Los Angeles Complexity in the Championship Gaming Series and the reality series WCG Ultimate Gamer.

Early life
Thorne was born in Trinidad and raised in Diego Martin, Trinidad. His parents both attended Pace University. Two years after Thorne was born, his parents had a second child: his younger sister Njideka (deka). He and his family later moved to the United States. During middle school, Thorne attended a religious private school. Thorne transferred back to the public school system in the 10th grade, where he attended West Orange High School in Winter Garden, Florida, where he grew up. During this time, his friends called him "Swoosh" because of his preference for Nike clothing, whose logo was the Swoosh. This nickname later morphed into "Swoozie".

During high school, Thorne was employed at Disney's Hollywood Studios in order to support his gaming hobby.

He applied to Ringling College of Art and Design (RCAD) and California Institute of the Arts because of his interest in animation but was rejected from both.

Career

Gaming 
After he worked at Disney, he was a lifeguard at Hard Rock Hotel. During this time, he became very successful at the video game Dead or Alive 3 and had garnered an online reputation.

Because of his notoriety, Thorne was asked to compete in the Championship Gaming Series (CGS) by DirecTV. He was later drafted by the Los Angeles Complexity team and played for one season but remained on the show as an on-camera personality for season two. His work on the CGS got him work shoutcasting for various events and later got him cast in WCG Ultimate Gamer.

YouTube 
Thorne began uploading vlogs onto YouTube to keep his friend and co-workers updated about his travels while he was competing in CGS. Later, he and YouTuber Michelle Phan did a collaborative video, which propelled his subscriber count. They had become acquainted through a mutual acquaintance at RCAD, where Phan was attending. Because of this growth, YouTube sent Thorne a $1600 gift-card to purchase camera equipment.

Thorne ran the gaming YouTube channel "Press Start" with Phan, last active in December 2011 as of December 2020.

In 2017, Thorne hosted the shoe design competition web series, Lace Up: The Ultimate Sneaker Challenge, on YouTube Red.

As of November 2022, his YouTube channel sWooZie has over 1.40 billion views.

Acting 
Thorne had a minor role in the film The Space Between Us (2017).

Personal life 
Thorne's grandmother is Chinese Trinidadian and Tobagonian.

Thorne is a Christian.

Awards and nominations

Further reading 

 (2017) Swoozie Interview Vlog Boss Radio

References

American YouTubers
People from Orlando, Florida
Living people
American esports players
Fighting game players
CompLexity Gaming players
Trinidad and Tobago emigrants to the United States
People from Diego Martin
Streamy Award winners
YouTube channels launched in 2006
YouTube animators
1980 births
Articles containing video clips